Pioneer Township is a township in Graham County, Kansas, USA.  As of the 2000 census, its population was 57.

Geography
According to the USGS, it contains four cemeteries: Buchanan Brown, McFarland, Prairie Dale and Whitfield.

References
 USGS Geographic Names Information System (GNIS)

External links
 US-Counties.com
 City-Data.com

Townships in Graham County, Kansas
Townships in Kansas